Chlorine oxide trifluoride or chlorine trifluoride oxide is a corrosive liquid molecular compound with formula ClOF3. It was developed secretly as a rocket fuel oxidiser.

Production
Chlorine oxide trifluoride was originally made at Rocketdyne by treating chlorine monoxide with fluorine. Other substances that could react with fluorine to make it includes sodium chlorite (NaClO2), and chlorine nitrate (ClONO2). The first published production method was a reaction of chlorine monoxide with oxygen difluoride (OF2). Yet other production methods are reactions between ClO2F or ClO3F and chlorine fluorides. A safer approach is the use chlorine nitrate with fluorine.

Reactions
As a Lewis base it can lose a fluoride ion to Lewis acids, yielding the difluorooxychloronium(V) cation (ClOF2+). Compounds with this include: ClOF2BF4, ClOF2PF6, ClOF2AsF6, ClOF2SbF6, ClOF2BiF6, ClOF2VF6, ClOF2NbF6, ClOF2TaF6, ClOF2UF6, ClOF2, (ClOF2)2SiF6, ClOF2MoOF5, ClOF2Mo2O4F9, ClOF2PtF6.

Functioning as a Lewis acid, it can gain a fluoride ion from a strong base to yield a tetrafluorooxychlorate(V) anion: ClOF4− ion. These include KClOF4, RbClOF4, and CsClOF4. This allows purification of ClOF3, as at room temperature a solid complex is formed, but this decomposes between 50 and 70 °C. Other likely impurities either will not react with alkali fluoride, or if they do will not easily decompose.

Chlorine trifluoride oxide fluoridates various materials such as chlorine monoxide, chlorine, glass or quartz.
ClOF3 + Cl2O → 2ClF + ClO2F;
2ClOF3 + 2Cl2 → 6ClF + O2 at 200 °C

Chlorine trifluoride oxide adds to chlorine fluorosulfate, ClOF3 + 2ClOSO2F → S2O5F2 + FClO2 + 2ClF. The reaction also produces SO2F2.

Chlorine trifluoride oxide can fluoridate and add oxygen in the same reaction, reacting with molybdenum pentafluoride, silicon tetrafluoride, tetrafluorohydrazine (over 100 °C), HNF2, and F2NCOF. From HNF2 the main result was NF3O. From MoF5, the results were MoF6 and MoOF4.

It reacts explosively with hydrocarbons. With small amounts of water, ClO2F is formed along with HF.

Over 280 °C ClOF3 decomposes to oxygen and chlorine trifluoride.

Properties
The boiling point of chlorine trifluoride oxide is 29 °C.

The shape of the molecule is a trigonal bipyramid, with two fluorine atoms at the top and bottom (apex) (Fa) and an electron pair, oxygen and fluorine (Fe) on the equator. The Cl=O bond length is 1.405 Å, Cl-Fe 1.603 Å, other Cl-Fa 1.713 Å, ∠FeClO=109° ∠FaClO=95°, ∠FaClFe=88°. The molecule is polarised, Cl has a +1.76 charge, O has −0.53, equatorial F has −0.31 and apex F has −0.46. The total dipole moment is 1.74 D.

References

Fluorine compounds
Chlorine(V) compounds